The golf tournaments at the 2024 Summer Olympics in Paris are scheduled to run from 1 to 10 August at Le Golf National in Guyancourt, featuring a total of 120 players (60 per gender) across two medal events. The golf qualification pathway and format for Paris remain the same as the previous two editions with 60 players qualifying for each gender-based event over a four-day-long, 72-hole individual stroke play tournament. The men's event will play first on 1 August with the women's side scheduled to occur four days later.

Qualification

Sixty players for each of the men's and women's tournaments will qualify for Paris 2024 based on the official IGF world ranking list of 17 June 2024 (for men) and 24 June 2024 (for women). The top 15 world-ranked golf players will be selected by name and secure their Olympic places, respecting the four-player limit per NOC. The remaining spots will be awarded to the players ranked sixteenth onwards on the list with a maximum of two per NOC. Each of the five continental zones must enter at least one player across all golf tournaments under the principles of the Olympic movement and the rules governed by IGF. If unsatisfied with the entry selection method described above, the highest-ranked eligible player from the respective continental zone will allocate the vacant spot. The IGF posts weekly lists of qualified male and female golf players based on their current standings.

Competition schedule

Medal summary

Medal table

Medalists

See also
Golf at the 2022 Asian Games
Golf at the 2023 Pan American Games

References

External links
  – IGF

 
2024 Summer Olympics
2024
2024 Summer Olympics events
Olympics